The Northern California Translators Association (NCTA) is a chapter of the American Translators Association. The NCTA was founded in 1978 and has over 500 members, including individuals, businesses, and institutions.

The NCTA holds four annual, general meetings, publishes a newsletter called Translorial, and hosts sittings of the American Translators Association's certification examination.

In California the term "Northern California" usually refers to the San Francisco Bay Area, and accordingly the NCTA is based in, and oriented toward the translator and interpreter community there.

External links
Northern California Translators Association
Translorial

Translation associations of the United States
Organizations based in California